A public recursive name server (also called public DNS resolver) is a name server service that networked computers may use to query the Domain Name System (DNS), the decentralized Internet naming system, in place of (or in addition to) name servers operated by the local Internet service provider (ISP) to which the devices are connected. Reasons for using these services include:

 speed, compared to using ISP DNS services
 filtering (security, ad-blocking, porn-blocking, etc.)
 reporting
 avoiding censorship
 redundancy (smart caching)
 access to unofficial alternative top level domains not found in the official DNS root zone
temporary unavailability of the ISP's name server

Public DNS resolver operators often cite increased privacy as an advantage of their services; critics of public DNS services have cited the possibility of mass data collection targeted at the public resolvers as a potential risk of using these services. Several services now support secure DNS lookup transport services such as DNS over HTTPS (DoH) and DNS over TLS (DoT).

Public DNS resolvers are operated either by commercial companies, offering their service for free use to the public, or by private enthusiasts to help spread new technologies and support non-profit communities.

Notable public DNS service operators

References

External links 

 Home page of the DNSCrypt project: Public DNS servers

Domain Name System
Alternative Internet DNS services
Distributed data structures